These are the statistics of the Latvian First League during the 2006 season.

Overview
16 teams participated in the league, and JFK Olimps Rīga won the championship.

League standings

Top scorers
 Ivans Lukjanovs (Olimps) - 27 goals

Latvian First League seasons
2
Latvia
Latvia